Smoked plum is the smoked fruit of Asian plums, used in East Asian cuisine and medicine. It is called wūméi in Mandarin, omae in Korean, ubai in Japanese, and Ô mai  in Vietnamese.

Overview
Smoked plums, matte black to dark brown, with a rugged surface, have a unique flavor with a sour taste. The surface is wrinkled, with the round stem-end underside. The seed is flat obloid and light yellow.

Production 

Use

Cuisine 
In China, smoked plums are used to make suānméitāng, a sour plum drink.

In Korea, smoked plums are used to make traditional teas and drinks such as omae-cha (smoked plum tea) and jeho-tang (medicinal summer drink).

Medicine 
Latin (pharmaceutical) name for smoked plums is Mume Fructus.

In Traditional Korean medicine, smoked plums are considered conductant for the liver channel, spleen channel, lung channel, and large intestine channel. It is used to treat ascariasis, vomiting, cough, and diarrhea. It is reported to relieve phlegm, inhibit intestinal motility, and fight bacteria in pharmacologic experiments.

Dyeing 

In Japan, the extract of smoked plums (ubai) is used as a mordant for the natural red dye derived from safflower (benibana).

See also
 List of smoked foods

References 

Chinese cuisine
Korean cuisine
Plum dishes
Smoked food
Traditional Korean medicine